Theta Cephei, Latinized from θ Cephei, is a stellar class A7, fourth-magnitude star in the constellation Cepheus. This displays at a metallic-line Am star. It is a white-hued, single-lined spectroscopic binary system, located about 127 light-years from Earth. The companion star is calculated to be about 400 times fainter than the primary. It is completely invisible in the spectrum, but is estimated to be a K7 main sequence star.

Shared with η Cep, this star system has the title Al Kidr.

References

A-type giants
Am stars
Spectroscopic binaries

Cepheus (constellation)
Cephei, Theta
Durchmusterung objects
Cephei, 02
195725
101093
7850